Baliochila neavei, the Neave's buff, is a butterfly in the family Lycaenidae which is found in Burundi, eastern Tanzania, the Democratic Republic of the Congo (Haut-Shaba), Malawi and Mozambique. Its habitat consists of forests.

Adults are on wing from August to April. The larvae feed on algae (cyanobacteria) which grows on trees.

References

Butterflies described in 1953
Poritiinae